was a Japanese field marshal, and one of the founders of the Imperial Japanese Army.

Biography

Early life

Ōyama was born in Kagoshima to a samurai family of the Satsuma Domain. as a younger paternal cousin to Saigo Takamori. A protégé of Ōkubo Toshimichi, he worked to overthrow the Tokugawa Shogunate and thus played a major role in the Meiji Restoration. He served as the commander of the Detached First Brigade during the Boshin War. At the Battle of Aizu, Ōyama was the commander of the Satchōdo's field artillery positions on Mount Oda. During the course of the siege, he was wounded by an Aizu guerilla force under Sagawa Kanbei.

Military career

In 1870, Ōyama was sent overseas to the École spéciale militaire de Saint-Cyr in France (August 1870 – March 1871) to study and was appointed the official Japanese military observer to the Franco-Prussian War.  He also spent three years (July 1871 – October 1874) in Geneva studying foreign languages, and became fluent in Russian. In 1872, he was sent by the Japanese government to the United States to study at Temple Hill Academy in Geneseo, New York. Ōyama Iwao is the first recorded Japanese customer for Louis Vuitton, having purchased some luggage during his stay in France. After promotion to major general, he went to France again for further study, together with Kawakami Sōroku. On his return home, he helped establish the fledgling Imperial Japanese Army, which was soon employed in suppressing the Satsuma Rebellion, although Ōyama and his elder brother were cousins of Saigō Takamori.

In the First Sino-Japanese War, Ōyama was appointed the commander-in-chief of the Japanese Second Army, which after landing on Liaotung Peninsula, carried Port Arthur by storm, and subsequently crossed to Shantung, where it captured the fortress of Weihaiwei. After the war, Ōyama was disparaged by American reporter Trumbull White for failing to restrain his troops during the Port Arthur Massacre.

For his services Ōyama received the title of marquis under the kazoku peerage system, and, three years later in January 1898, he became a field-marshal. In the Russo-Japanese War of 1904–1905 he was appointed the Commander-in-Chief of the Japanese armies in Manchuria. As Supreme Commander of the Japanese Manchurian Army, Ōyama had complete authority over all Japanese land operations during the war, and personally directed the tactics of Japanese forces in all major battles, winning the Battle of Liaoyang and repulsing Russian counter-attacks at the Battle of Shaho and the Battle of Sandepu. He was replaced by General Kodama Gentarō briefly during early 1905 due to illness, but recovered to direct Japanese forces in the final Battle of Mukden.

Political career and death

As the War Minister in several cabinets and as the Chief of the Army General Staff,  Ōyama upheld the autocratic power of the oligarchs (genrō) against democratic encroachments. However, unlike Yamagata Aritomo, Ōyama was reserved and tended to shun politics.

In 1906, Ōyama was awarded the Order of Merit by King Edward VII. His Japanese decorations included Order of the Golden Kite (1st class) and Order of the Chrysanthemum.

Ōyama died at the age of seventy five in 1916. Ōyama was a large man, and enjoyed large meals. His weight exceeded , and may have contributed to his death, possibly arising from diabetes.

Personal life

Family

Ōyama's first wife Sawa died of puerperal disorder. Second wife Sutematsu (a survivor of the Battle of Aizu, a sister of former Aizu retainers Yamakawa Hiroshi and Yamakawa Kenjirō) was one of the first female students sent to the United States as part of the Iwakura Mission in the early 1870s. She spent eleven years there, graduating from Vassar College in 1882. In the next year she accepted her former enemy's proposal.

Ōyama was Emperor Meiji's first candidate for rearing future emperor Hirohito as a sort of surrogate father in 1901, in accordance with royal customs, but Ōyama declined and the role instead went to Count Kawamura Sumiyoshi.

Ōyama's first son Takashi, a navy cadet, died in the accidental explosion and sinking of the cruiser  in 1908. Second son Kashiwa (ja) became an archaeologist after he retired from army.

House

Ōyama, who spoke and wrote several European languages fluently, also liked European-style architecture. During his tenure as the War Minister, he built a large house in Tokyo modelled after a German castle.

Although he was very pleased with the design, his wife Sutematsu did not like it at all, and insisted that the children's room be remodelled in Japanese style, so that they would not forget their Japanese heritage. The house was destroyed by the Great Kantō earthquake in 1923 or possibly by American air raids during World War II .

Kimigayo

In 1869, the British military band instructor John William Fenton, who was then working in Yokohama as an o-yatoi gaikokujin, told the members of Japan's military band about the British national anthem "God Save the King" and emphasised the necessity of a similar national anthem for Japan. The band members requested artillery Captain Ōyama Iwao, who was well versed in Japanese and Chinese literature, to select appropriate words and Ōyama selected the poem which came to be used in Japan's national anthem kimigayo.

Honours

From the Japanese Wikipedia

Japanese
  Grand Cordon of the Order of the Rising Sun (1 November 1882; Second Class: 9 November 1877)
 Count (7 July 1884)
  Imperial Japanese Constitution Promulgation Commemorative Medal (25 November 1889)
  Grand Cordon of the Order of the Paulownia Flowers (5 August 1895)
 Marquess (5 August 1895)
  1894–95 Sino-Japanese War Medal (18 November 1895)
  1904–05 Russo-Japanese War Medal (1 April 1906)
  Order of the Golden Kite, First Class (1 April 1906; Second Class: 5 August 1895)
  Collar of the Order of the Chrysanthemum (1 April 1906; Grand Cordon: 3 June 1902)
 Prince (21 September 1907)
  Imperial Accession Commemorative Medal (10 November 1915)
 Silver gift cup set (1 April 1916)
  First World War Medal (1 April 1916)

Court order of precedence
 Senior sixth rank (May 1871)
 Senior fifth rank (24 February 1875)
 Fourth rank (16 December 1879)
 Senior fourth rank (24 May 1880)
 Third rank (27 December 1884)
 Second rank (19 October 1886)
 Senior second rank (20 December 1895)
 Junior First Rank (10 December 1916; posthumous)

Foreign
  Grand Cross of the Order of the Crown of Italy (20 March 1883)
  Grand Cross of the Order of the Crown of Prussia (4 February 1884)
  Grand Cross of the Order of Saints Maurice and Lazarus of the Kingdom of Italy (9 February 1885)
  Knight First Class of the Order of the Iron Crown of Austria-Hungary (9 February 1885)
  Knight Grand Cordon of the Order of the White Eagle of the Russian Empire (1885)
  Order of the Crown of Thailand, 1st Class (1 May 1891)
  Order of Osmanieh, 1st Class of the Ottoman Empire (27 May 1891)
  Knight of the Order of Merit of the Prussian Crown with swords (22 March 1906)
  Order of Merit (OM) of the United Kingdom (5 April 1906)
  Grand Cross of the Legion of Honour of France (27 December 1906; Grand Officer: 13 April 1883)

Other
Namesake of Oyama, British Columbia, a small town in British Columbia, Canada and Oyama Regional Park in Saskatchewan, Canada.

Ancestry

See also
Kimigayo
Katsura Ōyama

Notes

References
 Bix, Herbert P. (2000). Hirohito and the Making of Modern Japan. New York: HarperCollins. ; 

 Jansen, Marius B. and Gilbert Rozman, eds. (1986). Japan in Transition: from Tokugawa to Meiji. Princeton: Princeton University Press. ;  OCLC 12311985
  Jansen, Marius B., (2000). The Making of Modern Japan. Cambridge: Harvard University Press. ;  OCLC 44090600
 Keene, Donald. (2002). Emperor of Japan: Meiji and His World, 1852–1912. New York: Columbia University Press. ; OCLC 46731178

Further reading 

 Gensui koshaku Oyama Iwao ("元帥公爵大山巌〔本編〕) ", with separate volume of Appendix. Oyama gensuiden kankokai (ed), 1935. Digital. Available only at the NDL and partner libraries. 
 Based on 1940 edition.
 Gensui koshaku Oyama Iwao Nempu ("元帥公爵大山巌 年譜"), by another group Oyama gensuiden kankojo (ed), 1940. Available only at the NDL and partner libraries. **

External links 

National Diet Library
 1,564 Original/microfisch items for Iwao Oyama (1842 – 1916), list of items available as pdf format . Some are published on Digital Collection, NDL.

|-

1842 births
1916 deaths
Military personnel from Kagoshima Prefecture
People from Satsuma Domain
Marshals of Japan
Ministers of the Imperial Japanese Army
Nobles of the Meiji Restoration
Shimazu retainers
Kazoku
People of the Boshin War
Japanese military personnel of the First Sino-Japanese War
Japanese military personnel of the Russo-Japanese War
Honorary members of the Order of Merit
Recipients of the Order of the Golden Kite, 1st class
Recipients of the Order of the Rising Sun
École Spéciale Militaire de Saint-Cyr alumni
Recipients of the Legion of Honour
Deaths from diabetes
Imperial Japanese Army officers